Pierce House may refer to: 
In the United States 
(Listed by state, then city)
Alabama
William F. Pierce House, Eutaw, Alabama, listed on the NRHP in Alabama

Arizona
Harry E. Pierce House, Phoenix, Arizona, listed on the NRHP in Phoenix, Arizona
N. Clyde, House, Phoenix, Arizona, listed on the NRHP in Phoenix, Arizona

California
Pierce Ranch, Inverness, California, listed on the NRHP in Marin County, California

Colorado
Pierce-Haley House, Denver, Colorado, listed on the NRHP in downtown Denver, Colorado

Florida
Thomas R. Pierce House, Bushnell, Florida, listed on the NRHP in Florida

Idaho
Pierce–Borah House, Garden City, Idaho, listed on the NRHP in Ada County, Idaho

Indiana
James Pierce Jr. House, West Lafayette, Indiana, [listed on the NRHP in Tippecanoe County, Indiana

Massachusetts
Pierce Farm Historic District, Arlington, Massachusetts, listed on the NRHP in Massachusetts
Pierce–Hichborn House, Boston, Massachusetts, listed on the NRHP in Massachusetts
Pierce House (Dorchester, Massachusetts), in the Dorchester neighborhood of Boston, listed on the NRHP in Massachusetts
Spencer-Pierce-Little House, Newbury, Massachusetts, listed on the NRHP in Massachusetts
F. Lincoln Pierce Houses, Newton, Massachusetts, listed on the NRHP in Massachusetts
Pierce House (Reading, Massachusetts), listed on the NRHP in Massachusetts
Capt. Mial Pierce Farm, Rehoboth, Massachusetts, listed on the NRHP in Massachusetts
Peirce–Nichols House, Salem, Massachusetts

Minnesota
Pierce House (Rochester, Minnesota), Rochester, Minnesota, listed on the NRHP in Olmsted County, Minnesota

New Hampshire
Pierce Manse or Franklin Pierce House, Concord, New Hampshire, listed on the NRHP in New Hampshire
Franklin Pierce Homestead, Hillsborough, New Hampshire, listed on the NRHP in New Hampshire

New Mexico
Pierce-Fuller House, Red River, New Mexico, listed on the NRHP in Taos County, New Mexico

New York
Charles Pierce House, Durham, New York, listed on the NRHP in New York

North Carolina
John M. Pierce House, Crumpler, North Carolina, listed on the NRHP in North Carolina

Ohio
Elijah Pierce Properties, Columbus, Ohio, listed on the NRHP in Ohio
Edgar T. Pierce House, Salem, Oregon, listed on the NRHP in Oregon

Pennsylvania
Lukens Pierce House, Ercildoun, Pennsylvania, listed on the NRHP in Pennsylvania
Jonas J. Pierce House, Sharpsville, Pennsylvania, listed on the NRHP in Pennsylvania
Tillie Pierce House Bed & Breakfast, (Maltilda's Mercantile), Gettysburg, Pennsylvania, listed as a 19th-century Civil War Building of Adams County  
Joseph Pierce Farm, North Kingstown, Rhode Island, listed on the NRHP in Rhode Island

Washington, D.C.
Pierce Springhouse and Barn, Washington, D.C., listed on the NRHP in Washington, D.C.
Pierce-Klingle Mansion, Washington, D.C.,listed on the NRHP in Washington, D.C.

Wisconsin
Carrie Pierce House, Madison, Wisconsin, listed on the NRHP in Wisconsin

See also
Pierce House (Boston, Massachusetts) (disambiguation)